Lagaan (soundtrack) is the soundtrack from the film Lagaan (also called Lagaan: Once Upon a Time in India). It was composed by A. R. Rahman, with lyrics by Javed Akhtar. The soundtrack is made up of are six songs and two instrumental pieces. Rahman incorporated several music styles and genres to create the soundtrack.

The soundtrack received high critical acclaim, with many reviewers stating it as a "Magnum Opus" by A. R. Rahman. It is described as one of Rahman's finest and most successful works to date. The rich background score of the film also got great critical acclaim and is said to have contributed immensely to the film's success.

Track listing
It was the highest selling album in 2001.
It was AR Rahman's 2nd Big Hit after Dil Se in that time.
Specially Inspirational song Mitwa and Classical Song Radha Kaise Na Jale by Udit and Asha were biggest hit in that time.

Reception
The Los Angeles Times said that the "songs and dances are not mere interludes inserted in the action, bringing it to a halt—a Bollywood trademark—but are fully integrated into the plot and marked by expressive, dynamic singing and dancing that infuse a historical drama with energy and immediacy." A review of the tracks suggests that "the music is true to the time period (the British Raj)". Another review said: "A. R. Rahman is again at his prodigious best. His score for Aamir Khan's period drama Lagaan is a delectable blend of Indian classical music, folk melodies and jazzy snazzy tunes." The reviewer of Screen India said, "Great music, heard after a long time, which elevates your senses. That Rahman's among the best is proved here." The soundtrack was ranked No. 44 on Amazon.com's "The 100 Greatest World Music Albums of All Time". The soundtrack won 3 National Film Awards in three categories. A. R. Rahman won the award for the best music, Udit Narayan won the Best Male Playback Singer Award for "Mitwa" and Javed Akhtar won the Best Lyrics Award for "Ghanan Ghanan" and "Radha Kaise Na Jale". Lagaan also became the biggest audio hit of the year by topping the music charts and selling 3.5 million records within a year. According to the Indian trade website Box Office India, with around 28,00,000 units sold, this film's soundtrack album was the year's fourth highest-selling.

References 

2001 soundtrack albums
A. R. Rahman soundtracks
Hindi film soundtracks